Shan United Football Club, known as Kanbawza FC until 2015, is a Burmese football club, based in Taunggyi, Myanmar. Their home stadium name is Taunggyi Stadium in Shan State.

Sponsorship

Club

Coaching staff
{|class="wikitable"
|-
!Position
!Staff
|-
|Manager|| Soe Myat Min
|-
|rowspan="2"|Assistant Manager|| U Aung Tun Tun
|-
| U Han Win Aung
|-
|Technical coach ||  U San Win
|-
|Goalkeeper Coach|| U Aung Thet
|-
|Fitness Coach|| Mr Jeret
|-

Other information

|-

Current squad

References

External links
 Kanbawza FC in Burmese
 First Eleven Journal in Burmese
 Soccer Myanmar in Burmese

Shan United